Mamadou Traoré may refer to:

 Mamadou Traoré (murderer) (born 1973), Senegalese-born French serial rapist and murderer
 Mamadou Traoré (footballer) (born 1994), Malian footballer
 Mamadou Lamine Traoré (1947-2007), Malian politician
 Mamadou Namory Traoré, Malian politician